Jackie Rivet-River is an American TV writer, director, producer, and founder of Peace Productions, a non-profit organization. She has created more than 15 television programs including documentaries such as Too Flawed to Fix: Inside the Illinois Capital Punishment System, In a Time of Siege; a film about the antiwar activities of activist Kathy Kelly and narrated by Studs Terkel, War on the Family: Mothers in Prison and the Children They Leave Behind and Who is Thy Neighbor?. She began her film career in Chicago at the Fred A. Niles Communications Center (now Harpo Productions) and was the first female in the Midwest Chapter of the Directors Guild of America.

Rivet-River won an Emmy award for both Too Flawed to fix (2002) and Who is Thy Neighbor? (1989). She also received a Silver Hugo at the Chicago International Film Festival, and 12 additional awards nationally for Where Is Dead?, which she wrote, produced and directed for Encyclopædia Britannica Films.

Other credits include a series of half-hour specials for NBC and ABC television that addressed issues faced by underrepresented segments of society such as latchkey kids, victims of domestic violence, people with AIDS, gays and lesbians, and children in war.

Rivet-River also produced the ABC-TV Network special for the National Council of Churches entitled Someone is Listening: Teens from Crisis to Caring with host Walter Payton. An anti-nuclear documentary she wrote and directed, If The World Goes Away Where Will the Children Play? was narrated by James Earl Jones with an original score by Martin Rubenstein played by the Chicago Symphony Orchestra. Her film Peace Like A River, aired on PBS with hostess Ellen Burstyn and others.

She recently completed War On The Family: Mothers in Prison for ABC-TV Chicago's Sanctuary series. Currently Rivet-Rivers is co-producing and co-directing a documentary in progress whose working is title is Tirados (Thrown Away) about masses of Latin American children who are victims of inhalant abuse—in the form of toxic toluene glue, child homelessness and child human trafficking.

References

Further reading
 

Year of birth missing (living people)
Living people
American television writers
American documentary filmmakers